Robert Sternfels is an American businessman who has been the managing partner of McKinsey & Company since July 2021.

Early life and education 
After growing up in Lodi, California, Sternfels studied history and economics at Stanford University, where he was a member of the NCAA Division I varsity water polo team. He went on to further study at Worcester College, Oxford as a Rhodes Scholar. While originally intending to read international law, he ended up studying towards an undergraduate degree in philosophy, politics and economics.

Career 
Sternfels joined McKinsey upon graduating from Oxford University in 1994. At the time of his election to managing partner in 2021, he led the firm's advanced analytics practice and was based in the firm's San Francisco office. He had previously led McKinsey's operations practice in the US and its private equity practice globally. 

He is a board member of QuestBridge, sits on the advisory board of USA Water Polo and is a trustee of the Rhodes Trust. He has also served as the treasurer of The American Oxonian.

References 

Living people
Year of birth missing (living people)
People from Lodi, California
Stanford University alumni
Alumni of Worcester College, Oxford
McKinsey & Company people

External links 

 Bob Sternfels on the website of McKinsey & Company

American Rhodes Scholars